The Confraternity Bible is any edition of the Catholic Bible translated under the auspices of the Confraternity of Christian Doctrine (CCD) between 1941 and 1969.  The Confraternity Bible strives to give a fluent English translation while remaining close to the Latin Vulgate. It is no longer in widespread use since it was supplanted in 1970 by the New American Bible.

History 
Volumes were released serially by St. Anthony Guild Press in New Jersey as they were completed. Their publishing history is as follows:
The Book of Genesis – 1948: this was a unique translation, the only one that was revised for the 1970 NAB
The Book of Psalms – 1950 and 1955, reprinted 1959
The Octateuch: Genesis to Ruth – 1952 (published as Volume One)
The Sapiential Books (Job to Sirach) – 1955 (published as Volume Three — with Volume Two left to be filled in later)
The Prophetic Books (Isaias to Malachias) – 1961 (published as Volume Four)
The Historical Books – Samuel to Maccabees (1 Samuel to Esther; 1 and 2 Maccabees) – 1969 (published as Volume Two)

Because of the hybrid nature of the various versions of the Confraternity Bible, it has been referred to as the "Douay-Confraternity Bible", referencing the fact that the Old Testament section was made up partly of books from the Challoner-Douay Old Testament and partly from books translated or revised by the CCD  Publishers released "Confraternity Bibles" up to 1969, always indicating to what extent they featured Confraternity translations of the Old Testament.  They typically included some variation on the following description of the edition's Old Testament contents:  "With the New Confraternity of Christian Doctrine Translation of the First Eight Books, the Seven Sapiential Books, and the Eighteen Prophetic Books of the Old Testament.  The balance is in the Douay Version."

See also
Council of Trent

References

Bible translations into English
Catholic bibles